The First Church of Christ, Scientist, in Boston, Massachusetts, U.S., is the administrative headquarters and mother church of the Church of Christ, Scientist.

First Church of Christ, Scientist may also refer to:

Australia 
 A church in Bowral, New South Wales
 First Church of Christ, Scientist, Brisbane, Queensland
 A church in North Terrace, Adelaide, South Australia
 A church in Ringwood, Victoria
 First Church of Christ, Scientist, Perth, Western Australia

Canada 
 First Church of Christ, Scientist (North Vancouver), British Columbia
 First Church of Christ, Scientist (Ottawa), Ontario
 First Church of Christ, Scientist (Toronto), Ontario

Hong Kong 
 First Church of Christ, Scientist (Hong Kong), listed under List of Grade II historic buildings in Hong Kong.

United Kingdom
 First Church of Christ, Scientist (Brighton)
 First Church of Christ, Scientist, Richmond, London
 Cadogan Hall, building formerly First Church of Christ, Scientist, London

United States

Arizona 
 First Church of Christ, Scientist (Phoenix, Arizona)

Arkansas 
First Church of Christ, Scientist (Little Rock, Arkansas)

California 
 First Church of Christ, Scientist (Berkeley, California)
 First Church of Christ, Scientist (Long Beach, California)
 First Church of Christ, Scientist (Los Angeles, California)
 First Church of Christ, Scientist (Riverside, California)

Colorado 
First Church of Christ, Scientist (Denver, Colorado), a Denver Landmark

Florida 
 First Church of Christ, Scientist (Cocoa, Florida)
 First Church of Christ, Scientist (Miami, Florida)
 First Church of Christ, Scientist (Orlando, Florida)
 First Church of Christ, Scientist (St. Petersburg, Florida)
 First Church of Christ, Scientist (West Palm Beach, Florida)

Georgia 
 First Church of Christ, Scientist (Atlanta)

Illinois 
 First Church of Christ, Scientist (Chicago, Illinois)
 First Church of Christ, Scientist (Rock Island, Illinois)

Iowa 
 First Church of Christ, Scientist (Davenport, Iowa)
 First Church of Christ, Scientist (Fairfield, Iowa)
 First Church of Christ, Scientist (Grinnell, Iowa) 
 First Church of Christ, Scientist (Marshalltown, Iowa)
 First Church of Christ, Scientist (Mason City, Iowa)

Indiana 
 First Church of Christ, Scientist (Huntington, Indiana)

Maryland 
 First Church of Christ, Scientist (Baltimore, Maryland)

Massachusetts 
 First Church of Christ, Scientist (Cambridge, Massachusetts)
 First Church of Christ, Scientist (Dedham, Massachusetts)
 First Church of Christ, Scientist (Newton, Massachusetts)

Michigan 
 Hilberry Theatre (Wayne State University), building formerly First Church of Christ, Scientist (Detroit)

Minnesota 
 First Church of Christ, Scientist (Fairmont, Minnesota)
 First Church of Christ, Scientist, Albion Avenue (Fairmont, Minnesota)
 First Church of Christ Scientist (Minneapolis, Minnesota)

Missouri 
 First Church of Christ, Scientist (St. Louis, Missouri)

Mississippi 
 First Church of Christ, Scientist (Vicksburg, Mississippi)

Nevada 
 First Church of Christ, Scientist (Reno, Nevada)

New York 
 First Church of Christ, Scientist (New York, New York)

North Carolina 
 First Church of Christ, Scientist (New Bern, North Carolina)

Ohio 
 First Church of Christ, Scientist (Cleveland, Ohio)
 First Church of Christ, Scientist (Elyria, Ohio)
 First Church of Christ, Scientist (Lakewood, Ohio)
 First Church of Christ, Scientist (Lebanon, Ohio)
 First Church of Christ, Scientist (Sandusky, Ohio)
 First Church of Christ, Scientist (Toledo, Ohio)

Oklahoma 
 First Church of Christ, Scientist (Oklahoma City)

Oregon 
 First Church of Christ, Scientist (Forest Grove, Oregon)
 First Church of Christ, Scientist (Portland, Oregon)

Pennsylvania 
 First Church of Christ, Scientist (Mt. Lebanon, Pennsylvania)
 First Church of Christ, Scientist (Pittsburgh, Pennsylvania)
 First Church of Christ, Scientist (Scranton, Pennsylvania)

Texas 
 First Church of Christ, Scientist (Paris, Texas)

Utah 
 First Church of Christ Scientist (Salt Lake City, Utah)

Washington (state) 
 First Church of Christ, Scientist (Seattle, Washington)
 First Church of Christ, Scientist (Tacoma, Washington)

Wisconsin 
 First Church of Christ, Scientist (Madison, Wisconsin)
 First Church of Christ, Scientist (Milwaukee, Wisconsin)
 First Church of Christ, Scientist (Neillsville, Wisconsin)
 First Church of Christ, Scientist (Oconto, Wisconsin)

See also 
 Church of Christ, Scientist
 First Church of Christ (disambiguation)
 Second Church of Christ, Scientist (disambiguation)
 Third Church of Christ, Scientist (disambiguation)
 Fourth Church of Christ, Scientist (disambiguation)
 Fifth Church of Christ, Scientist (disambiguation)
 Sixth Church of Christ, Scientist (disambiguation)
 Eighth Church of Christ, Scientist
 Seventeenth Church of Christ, Scientist
 List of former Christian Science churches, societies and buildings